The 1981 BMW Championships was a women's tennis tournament played on outdoor grass courts at Devonshire Park in Eastbourne in the United Kingdom that was part of the Toyota Series category of the 1981 WTA Tour. It was the eighth edition of the tournament and was held from 15 June through 21 June 1981. First-seeded Tracy Austin won the singles title and earned $22,000 first-prize money.

Finals

Singles
 Tracy Austin defeated  Andrea Jaeger 6–3, 6–4
It was Austin's 2nd singles title of the year and the 23rd of her career.

Doubles
 Martina Navratilova /  Pam Shriver defeated  Kathy Jordan /  Anne Smith 6–7(5–7), 6–2, 6–1

Prize money

References

External links
 International Tennis Federation (ITF) tournament edition details

BMW Championships
Eastbourne International
BMW Championships
BMW Championships
1981 in English women's sport